P. olivaceus may refer to:

Panaeolus olivaceus, a mushroom species
Paralichthys olivaceus, the olive flounder, a flatfish species
Phylloscopus olivaceus, the Philippine leaf warbler, a bird species
Picumnus olivaceus, the olivaceous piculet, a bird species
Prionochilus olivaceus, the olive-backed flowerpecker, a bird species
Pristimantis olivaceus, a frog species
Psophodes olivaceus, the eastern whipbird, a bird species